Philosina is a damselfly genus in the family Philosinidae, found in Asia.

Species include:
 Philosina alba
 Philosina buchi

References

Calopterygoidea
Taxa named by Friedrich Ris
Zygoptera genera